Alfred G. Berner Middle School is a middle school that serves Massapequa, New York since 1987 after the conversion from Berner High School. The school was named after Alfred G. Berner, who served on the Board of Education from 1945 to 1954. The campus currently serves students in grades 6-8 that matriculate to Massapequa High School.

History
Berner High School opened in January 1962 as a junior high school under principal Donald Woodworth. Half of that year's 9th and 10th grade students attending Massapequa High School were assigned to Berner High School for the 1962–1963 school year and the school's enrollment peaked in the early 1970s. After a decline in district enrollment from a high of 17,000 students in 1970 to 7,800 by 1986, Berner High School closed in 1987.

There is currently no talk of returning the middle school's status to a high school, though it is possible that many of the schools in the Massapequa Union Free School District system may exchange uses, due to the rising adolescent population in both Massapequa and Massapequa Park. In February 2016, the Massapequa School District's Board of Education voted to move the district's 6th graders into Berner starting in the 2017–2018. Unfortunately, the move was reversed in a 3–2 vote in July 2017, leaving the people against the move happy and the people for the move upset. The July vote was the result of many angry parents against the move attending the regular Board of Education meeting in May. The Board of Ed agreed to vote on the 6th graders again in July and if the move was still going on, a public vote would have taken place in January 2018 to decide if the next incoming 6th grade class and future classes were to go to Berner or to remain at the Elementary level for 6th grade. Unfortunately, that was not the case since Board of Ed members Timothy Taylor, Brian Butler, and Joseph LaBella voted against the move. LaBella, who was originally voted for the move, changed sides in this vote due to him receiving many emails from angry parents. He was considered "The Middle Man" in this vote since 2 members voted against (as mentioned above) and the remaining 2 members, Marianne Fisher and Gary Baldinger, voted for the move. Incoming 6th graders protested to get their class back into Berner Middle School, as they have already graduated and had their festivities for their graduation. Even though people think that nothing could be done after creating an online petition and protesting in front of the BOE office, the Board of Education received a stay from the NYS Department of Education on August 1, 2017 that requires them to leave the move as is and let the 6th graders go where they all wish to be, at Berner. It was officially decided at the August 3, 2017 regular board meeting that the 6th graders will be going to Berner in September 2017. At the meeting, the Board of Ed was considering to get into legal affairs with the power of attorney to once again try and reverse this move.

All four of the Baldwin brothers are Berner alumni.

Campus
The former high school's athletic facilities, including a track, football field, and tennis courts, have mostly fallen into disrepair. In summer of 2016, the Massapequa Board of Education elected to renovate the athletic facilities at Berner due to the disrepair of the facilities over the years. The north soccer field is still often used by the Long Island Junior Soccer League for the Massapequa Soccer Club's travel teams, but the south soccer field is often torn up due to constant use by middle school students during the soccer and football seasons. It is also used heavily for adult leagues and unsanctioned soccer games during the weekends.
The tennis courts have recently been torn down and they have built a new softball field there instead.

Extracurricular activities

Athletics
Berner holds one state football record: second place (tie) for most field goals in a single football game, set by Richard Pierce in 1983 with 4 field goals in one game.

Robert "Bob" Reifsnyder, an All-American player at the U.S. Naval Academy and who was inducted into the College Football Hall of Fame in 1997, was the varsity football coach for the Berner Bisons for many years as well as a math teacher at the school. Reifsndyer, the 1957 recipient of the Maxwell Award for College Player of the Year, coached at least two of the Baldwin brothers, Alec and Daniel.

Under Reifsnyder, the football Bisons won the South Shore (Long Island) championship in 1971 and made it to the Nassau County Conference I-II championship game in 1974 (lost to Syosset).

The Berner football team went undefeated in 1967 and 1968.

Thomas Cappelluzzo, a cross-country runner, won the New York State (NYSPHSAA) Cross-Country Championships - Class A race - in November 1971, posting the fastest time of three class races held, while also setting a course record. He won the Mile run in the inaugural New York State (NYSPHSAA) Indoor Track & Field Championships in March 1972.

2009 Enrollment 
As of 2009 Berner Middle School had an enrollment of approximately 1,600+ students.

Notable alumni
Alec Baldwin (1976)
Daniel Baldwin (1979)
William Baldwin (1981)
Stephen Baldwin (1984)
Bob Nelson (1976)
Keith R. Harris (1984)
Emily Pickering (1981)

References

Defunct schools in New York (state)
Educational institutions established in 1962
Educational institutions disestablished in 1987
1962 establishments in New York (state)
1987 establishments in New York (state)